Jingtian station is a metro station on Line 2 and Line 9 of the Shenzhen Metro. It opened on 28 June 2011. Jingtian will become an interchange with Line 9 from 30 December 2016.

Station layout

Exits

References

External links
 Shenzhen Metro Jingtian Station (Line 2) (Chinese)
 Shenzhen Metro Jingtian Station (Line 2) (English)
 Shenzhen Metro Jingtian Station (Line 9) (Chinese)
 Shenzhen Metro Jingtian Station (Line 9) (English)

Shenzhen Metro stations
Railway stations in Guangdong
Futian District
Railway stations in China opened in 2011